Jan Mohammad Chahi (also Romanized as Jān Moḩammad Chāhī) is a village in Ladiz Rural District, in the Central District of Mirjaveh County, Sistan and Baluchestan Province, Iran. At the 2006 census, its population was 31, in 7 families.

References 

Populated places in Mirjaveh County